Ford Spur is a prominent spur which marks the southwestern extremity of Haynes Table, and the confluence of Keltie Glacier and Brandau Glacier in the Queen Maud Mountains of Antarctica. It was named by the New Zealand Geological Survey Antarctic Expedition (1961–62) for C. Reginald Ford, Stores Officer for Robert Falcon Scott's British National Antarctic Expedition (1901–04).

References 

Ridges of the Ross Dependency
Dufek Coast